Beend Banoongaa Ghodi Chadhunga is an Indian television series which aired on Imagine TV from  28 March 2011  to 24 February 2012. It is based on the story of two people who get caught up in the web of strong traditions. The show is set in Jaipur.

Plot
Jai is the youngest son of the wealthy and traditional Poddar family. He goes through life like a dream. One day, he sees Sarika and falls in love with her. He dreams of marrying her. Sarika, on the other hand, doesn't know Jai; she hasn't even seen him. All Sarika wants is to be is a doctor. However, in Marwari families, the women stay at home to look after their households while the men go out to work. So, Sarika's grandmother is against the young woman's becoming a doctor and wants her married as soon as possible. On one side is Jai, pining for Sarika, and on the other side, is Sarika, with her dreams of being a doctor and no foreseeable plan of getting married.

Eventually, Jai and Sarika get married with the blessings of both their families. But the Poddars are against Sarika's further education. She has to overcome their reservations and doubts in order to get enrolled in medical college.

Because as she starts going to college, many problems crop up within her in-laws' family. The discussions of this by their neighbors, relatives, family friends and employees of their business embarrassed them. This embarrassment starts to change their minds. They give Sarika three months to prove that she can balance studies and family. However, this is not the only hurdle Sarika has to face. One of her college professors is hostile to her and tries everything possible to make her leave the course. In the end, all is settled, and Sarika completes her college earning her degree thus making her dream of becoming a doctor come true.

Cast
 Jayashree Venkataramanan as Sarika Poddar
 Anuj Thakur / Naman Shaw as Jai Poddar
 Rishika Mihani as Komal
 Nausheen Ali Sardar as Santosh Poddar
 Rucha Gujarathi as Meera
 Shaleen Bhanot as Mihir
 Ashish Kapoor as Jijaji
 Sahil Chaddha / Gaurav Khanna as Mr. Poddar (Jai's father)
 Khyaati Khandke Keswani as Laxmi
 Himani Shivpuri as Sarika's grandmother 
 Neena Cheema as Mrs. Poddar (Jai's grandmother)
 Mukesh Rawal as Mr. Poddar (Jai's grandfather)
 Amrin Chakkiwala as Taruna
 Ankit Arora as Chandan Poddar
 Akshay Anand as Mr. Poddar (Jai's paternal uncle)
 Archana Taide as Panvi
 Sandit Tiwari as Rakesh

Characters and themes

Sarika, a middle-class young woman, wants to become a doctor. Jai, a wealthy young man, is happy sitting on the counter of his father's spice business outlet, with no aim and ambition of his own.

Sarika has traditional values at heart and wants to strike a balance between home and her dreams. She believes that she would make a great homemaker as well as a doctor. Under family pressure Sarika is forced to marry Jai just when her medical entrance exam results are declared. Sarika feels that marriage would be the biggest hindrance in her path of becoming a doctor. However, as the marriage takes place and Sarika joins Jai's house, he becomes the biggest supporter of her dreams.

As we see the journey of this married young woman going to college every day, there is a conflict at home: For a conservative Marwari family, a daughter-in-law going to college is not their way of life. The one person who stands with her all through is her husband Jai.

Jai, a high school dropout himself, starts respecting education only after meeting Sarika. He realizes the meaning of ambition and focus in life through her. And in Jai, Sarika finds the man who surely loves her most in the world and would do anything for her.

Set against a backdrop of a conservative Marwari family with staunch beliefs and rigid norms, BBGC is a tale of how Jai will help Sarika live her dreams in the midst of family protests.

References

External links
Beend Banoongaa Ghodi Chadhunga Official Site on Imagine TV

Imagine TV original programming
Indian television soap operas
2011 Indian television series debuts
2012 Indian television series endings
Television shows set in Jaipur